Kermode is a surname of Manx origin. It may refer to:

I Surname
 Robert Kermode (1812–1870), Tasmanian politician
 P. M. C. Kermode (Philip Moore Callow Kermode, 1855–1932), Manx antiquarian and historian
 Alexander Kermode (1876–1934), Australian cricketer
 Derwent William Kermode (died 1960), British diplomat
 Josephine Kermode (Cushag, 1852–1937), Manx poet and playwright
 Harry Kermode (1922–2009), Canadian basketball player
 Frank Kermode (1919–2010), British literary critic
 Jonathan Kermode (fl. 1970s), musician in the band Half Brother
 Robin Kermode (born 1958), British actor, author and communications coach
 Mark Kermode (born 1963), British film critic
 Chris Kermode (born 1965), English tennis administrator

Other
Kermode bear, also known as the spirit bear

See also
 MacDermot, a surname of which Kermode is a variant

Surnames of Manx origin
Manx-language surnames